Hibiscus insularis, the Phillip Island hibiscus, is a species of flowering plant in the mallow family Malvaceae, that is endemic to Phillip Island, a small island to the south of Norfolk Island, Australia. The entire natural extent of this species is just two small clumps, and each clump apparently consists of multiple separate stems of a single genotype.  It has been propagated and planted more widely on Phillip Island, but only vegetatively which does not increase the genetic diversity.  Seedlings apparently have not been observed in the wild.  It produces greenish-yellow flowers that fade to mauve through most of the year.

Horticultural use of the Philip Island hibiscus has greatly increased the number of plants (though not in its natural environment) but as it is usually propagated by cuttings the number of genotypes is still extremely small.  This species is listed as Critically Endangered under Australian federal environment legislation.

References

Botanic Gardens Trust: Hibiscus insularis+
Coyne, Peter. Norfolk Island's Fascinating Flora. Petaurus Press, 2011, p. 64

insularis
Flora of Norfolk Island
Malvales of Australia
Critically endangered flora of Australia
Plants described in 1833